Popfrenzy is an independent record label and touring-events agency created by Chris Wu based in Sydney, Australia.

They began in the late 1990s, putting on various underground parties/nights. Between 2000 and 2006, they booked such Sydney clubs and venues as the Spanish, Mandarin, Taxi and Teachers Clubs.

Around 2003, Popfrenzy started to bring overseas acts to Australia as well establishing their own record label. The first two releases were from Camera Obscura and Les Savy Fav.

They also started and ran an independent record store between mid-2005 and mid-2006 in Surry Hills, Sydney, called Gifted Records.

Notable artists
 Best Coast
 Deerhunter
 Neon Indian
 Metronomy
 Ty Segall
 Blonde Redhead
 HEALTH
 Electrelane
 Matt & Kim
 Wire
 High Places
 Times New Viking
 Marnie Stern
 Broadcast
 The Drums
 Gruff Rhys
 Camera Obscura
 The Clientele
 Slow Club
 Even As We Speak
 Xiu Xiu
 Patrick Wolf
 Institut Polaire
 Les Savy Fav
 The Rogers Sisters
 Saturday Looks Good To Me
 The Organ
 Q and Not U
 Jeff Hanson
 Crooked Fingers
 Smoosh
 Need New Body
 Calvin Johnson
 The Blow
 The Gossip
 The Robot Ate Me
 Day Ravies

See also 
 List of record labels

External links
 Official site

Australian independent record labels
Indie rock record labels
Record labels established in 1999
1999 establishments in Australia